The flag of Dutch Limburg is a flag with the height:width ratio of 2:3. It consists of 3 rows of colors in a size ratio of 2:1:2. The colors used are (from top to bottom) white, blue and gold (yellow).

In the flag there is a symbol of the red Limburgian lion with a double tail, facing the flagpole. The smaller blue middle row is symbolizing the river Meuse.

This flag is not used in Belgian Limburg, which has its own, different, flag.

Flags of the Netherlands
Flag
Flags displaying animals
Flags introduced in 1953